Elroy Edwin Junior Kuylen (born 6 June 1983) is a Belizean professional football midfielder who plays for C.D. Platense.

He is a regular choice for the Belize national football team.

International career

International goals
Scores and results list Belize's goal tally first.

References

External links
https://www.thefinalball.com/player/elroy_kuylen/current/profile/0/default/111510

1983 births
Living people
Belizean footballers
Belize international footballers
New Site Erei players
Platense F.C. players
Belizean expatriate footballers
Expatriate footballers in Honduras
Premier League of Belize players
Liga Nacional de Fútbol Profesional de Honduras players
2009 UNCAF Nations Cup players
2011 Copa Centroamericana players
2017 Copa Centroamericana players
Association football midfielders